Szélanya (Old Turkic: Çel Ene or Cel Ana, "Wind Mother") is the Hungarian goddess or deity of wind.

Names in various languages
Uzbek: Yel Ona
Tatar: Җил Әни or Җил  Ана or Cil Ana 
Kazakh: Жел Ана 
Chuvash: Ҫил Анне or Ҫил Абай 
Bashkort: Εл Апай 
Sakha: Тыал Ий̃э 
Turkmen: Ýel Ene or Yel Eje  
Kyrgyz: Жел Эне 
Khakas: Чил Ине or Чил Иӌе 
Balkar: Джел Ана
Mongolian: Салхи Ээж
Buryat: Һалхин Эхэ
Oirat: Салькн Эк
Altay: Салкын Эне
Tuvan: Салгын Ава 
Turkish: Yel Ana

All of them mean, "wind mother".

The Onoghurs also worshipped her.

Description
She is a wise, elderly woman who lives in a cave on top of a huge mountain somewhere at the end of the world. She rides the winds and creates storms and whirlwinds.

Szelanya has a Slavic version which is a nymph who has power over wind, which she delight in causing storms. She lives around hills, mountains, and high mounds.

In Hungarian and Turkic mythology, she is also believed to be female fairy-like spirit who lives in the wilderness and sometimes in the clouds.

References

Bibliography
 Mitológiai enciklopédia I. Főszerk. Szergej Alekszandrovics Tokarjev. A magyar kiadást szerk. Hoppál Mihály. Budapest: Gondolat. 1988.  
 Türk Mitolojisi Ansiklopedik Sözlük, Celal Beydili, Yurt Yayınevi (Page - 608)

External links
 Pagan Study Group - Wind deities

See also
 Hungarian mythology
 Yel iyesi
 Szelatya

Hungarian mythology
Turkic deities
Wind goddesses